Reganochromis calliurus is a species of cichlid endemic to Lake Tanganyika in East Africa. It lives over a sandy substrate in deeper coastal waters, to depths of at least . Its preferred diet consists mostly of shrimp. This fish can also be found in the aquarium trade. It is currently the only known member of its genus.

Etymology 
The generic name is a compound noun, made up of the surname Regan, in honour of the British ichthyologist Charles Tate Regan (1878-1943) of the British Museum (Natural History), and the Greek word chromis which was used by Aristotle for a type of fish. This was probably the drum Sciaenidae and may be derived from the word chroemo which means "to neigh" in reference to the noise made by drums. This word was applied to a number of percomorph fishes, such as damselfish, cardinalfish, dottybacks, wrasses and cichilds, by ichthyologists as these were thought to be closely related.

References 
 Boulenger G. A. (1901) Diagnoses of new fishes discovered by Mr. J. E. S. Moore in lakes Tanganyika and Kivu.  Ann. Mag. Nat. Hist. (Ser. 7) 1-6
 Whitley G. P. (1929) Studies in ichthyology No. 3.  Rec. Aust. Mus. 101-143

External links 
 Photograph

Limnochromini
Fish of Africa
Taxa named by George Albert Boulenger
Fish described in 1901